Cymindis simplex is a species of ground beetle in the subfamily Harpalinae. It was described by Zoubkoff in 1833.

References

simplex
Beetles described in 1833